The Fort Wayne Open was a golf tournament on the LPGA Tour, played only in 1954. It was played at the Orchard Ridge Country Club in Fort Wayne, Indiana. Marilynn Smith won the event.

References

Former LPGA Tour events
Golf in Indiana
Sports in Fort Wayne, Indiana
1954 establishments in Indiana
1954 disestablishments in Indiana
History of women in Indiana